Virginia's sixth congressional district is a United States congressional district in the Commonwealth of Virginia.  It covers much of the west-central portion of the state, including Roanoke and most of the Shenandoah Valley. The current representative is Ben Cline (R), who has held the seat since the 2019 retirement of incumbent Republican Bob Goodlatte.

The district was an open seat in 2018. In November 2017, Goodlatte announced that he would retire from Congress at the end of his current term, and would not seek re-election.

Historically, the 6th district was one of the first areas of Virginia to turn Republican. Many of the old Byrd Democrats in the area began splitting their tickets and voting Republican at the national level as early as the 1930s. It was also one of the first areas of Virginia where Republicans were able to break the long Democratic dominance at the state and local level. The district itself was in Republican hands from 1953 to 1983. Democrat Jim Olin then won the seat in 1982, and held it for a decade before Goodlatte won it.

Some counties in the district have not supported a Democrat for president since Franklin D. Roosevelt. For instance, Highland and Shenandoah counties last voted for a Democratic presidential candidate in 1932, and Augusta and Roanoke counties have not supported a Democrat since 1944. The district as a whole has not supported a Democrat for president since Lyndon B. Johnson in 1964.

Area covered
It covers all or part of the following political subdivisions:

Counties
The entirety of:
 Amherst County
 Augusta County
 Bath County
 Botetourt County
 Highland County
 Page County
 Rockbridge County
 Rockingham County
 Shenandoah County
 Warren County
Portions of:
Bedford County
Roanoke County

Cities
 Buena Vista
 Harrisonburg
 Lexington
 Lynchburg 
 Roanoke
 Staunton
 Waynesboro

Recent election results

2000s

2010s

2020s

Recent results in statewide elections

List of members representing the district

Historical district boundaries

See also

Virginia's congressional districts
List of United States congressional districts

References 

 Congressional Biographical Directory of the United States 1774–present

06
Constituencies established in 1789
1789 establishments in Virginia
Constituencies disestablished in 1933
1933 disestablishments in Virginia
Constituencies established in 1935
1935 establishments in Virginia